The 2014 Miami Beach Bowl was a post-season American college football bowl game played on December 22, 2014, at Marlins Park in Miami, Florida.  The first edition of the Miami Beach Bowl, it featured the American Athletic Conference co-champion Memphis Tigers against the BYU Cougars.  It began at 2:00 p.m. EST and aired on ESPN. It was one of the 2014–15 bowl games that comprised the conclusion of the 2014 FBS football season.

Memphis defeated BYU in double overtime by the score of 55–48. Afterwards, the two teams engaged in a bench-clearing brawl.

Team selection
The game featured the American Athletic Conference co-champion Memphis Tigers against the BYU Cougars.

This was the first meeting between these two teams.

BYU Cougars

In April 2014, organizers announced that they had reached a deal with BYU to play in the inaugural Miami Beach Bowl in 2014. After defeating the UNLV Rebels for their sixth win of the season on November 15, bowl director Carlos Padilla II extended an invitation to play in the game.

This was BYU's third Florida bowl game, following the 1976 Tangerine Bowl where they lost to Oklahoma State 21–49, and the 1985 Citrus Bowl where they lost to Ohio State 7–10.

Memphis Tigers

After finishing the regular season with a 9–3 record and a share of the American Athletic Conference championship, the Tigers accepted their bid to the Miami Beach Bowl.

This was Memphis' second Florida bowl game, following the 2008 St. Petersburg Bowl (the inaugural contest for that bowl game) where they lost to the South Florida Bulls by a score of 14–41.  This was the Tigers' first bowl appearance since that game.

Game summary

Statistics

Post-game

Brawl
During the post game celebration Memphis players ran towards the BYU sideline to celebrate with their fans sitting behind the BYU bench (due to the bizarre baseball stadium field layout, most of the people in attendance could only sit on the BYU side of the field).  Some bumping and shoving occurred and one Memphis player was pushed in the back by a BYU player that was allegedly also being pushed from behind.  The Memphis player he pushed then turned around and (using both hands) punched/shoved the BYU player in the back of the head.  As the BYU player turned his attention back to the attacker in an apparent attempt to retaliate he threw a punch and he was attacked by 3-4 Memphis players and an all out, bench-clearing brawl ensued.  Punches and kicks were thrown by many players on both sides, one Memphis player even used a helmet as a weapon, and when it was over, numerous players walked off the field bloody and bruised.  As the brawl was dying down a BYU player (Kai Nacua) can be seen coming into view and sucker punching a Memphis player (Alan Cross), who was not wearing a helmet, from behind.  As the BYU player turned toward the camera's view, a bloodied bruise could be clearly seen from a punch he received while attempting to defend himself from another Memphis player earlier in the brawl.

Aftermath

Tom Holmoe, BYU's athletic director, apologized to BYU fans stating, "We expect better of our athletes, even in the face of a difficult loss. We intend to fully review this matter. I apologize to Cougar Nation." Memphis said in a statement via AAC commissioner Mike Aresco that they are displeased with the Miami Beach Bowl brawl, and that, "The university will respond accordingly following this detailed review. Needless to say, we are extremely disappointed that this happened, as we expect the highest standard of conduct from our student-athletes."

On January 20, 2015, The University of Memphis announced the completion of an internal review of the incident and expected punishments to be levied against twelve members of the team.  BYU also took action to punish their players. Kai Nacua, Trey Dye, Sione Takitaki, and Tomasi Laulile were all suspended for BYU's season opener against Nebraska.

References

2014–15 NCAA football bowl games
2014
2014
2014
Brawls in team sports
College football controversies
2014 controversies in the United States
Controversies in Florida
2014 in sports in Florida
2010s in Miami
December 2014 sports events in the United States
Violence in sports
2014